Shihavan Bangar is a small village on the right (north) bank of the Yamuna River in Mat Tehsil, Mathura District, Uttar Pradesh, India.  It is across the river from Kewat Nagla.

Politics
Mant (Assembly constituency) is the Vidhan Sabha constituency. Mathura (Lok Sabha constituency) is the parliamentary constituency.

References

Villages in Mathura district